Sosnovsky District is the name of several administrative and municipal districts in Russia.  The name is generally derived from or is related to the root "sosna" ("pine").
Sosnovsky District, Chelyabinsk Oblast, an administrative and municipal district of Chelyabinsk Oblast
Sosnovsky District, Nizhny Novgorod Oblast, an administrative and municipal district of Nizhny Novgorod Oblast
Sosnovsky District, Tambov Oblast, an administrative and municipal district of Tambov Oblast

Former districts
Sosnovsky District, Leningrad Oblast, an administrative district of Leningrad Oblast between 1948 and 1960, previously known as Rautovsky District.

See also
Sosnovsky (disambiguation)

References